Chandraprabha or Chandranatha is the eighth Tirthankara of  of Jainism in the present age. According to traditional accounts, he was born to King Mahasena and Queen Lakshmana Devi at Chandrapuri to the Ikshvaku dynasty. According to Jain texts, his birth-date was the twelfth day of the Posh Krishna month of the Indian calendar. He is said to have become a siddha, a liberated soul which has destroyed all of its karma.

Jain biography

Birth 
Chandraprabha was the eighth Jain Tīrthankara of the present age (avasarpini). He was born to King Mahasena and Queen Lakshmana Devi at Chandrapuri, Varanasi on 12th day month Pausa in the Ikshvaku clan. Nine months before the birth of Chandraprabha, Queen Lakshmana Devi  dreamt the sixteen most auspicious dreams. Mahasena named Tirthankar Chandraprabha because of his complexion was white as moon. According to Uttarapurana, Indra named him Chandraprabha because at his birth the earth and night-lotus were blossomed.

Life before renunciation 
Chandraprabha spent 2 lakh pūrva as youth (kumāra kāla) and ruled His kingdom for 6 lakh pūrva and 24 pūrvāṇga (rājya kāla). During his rule, Chandraprabhu was apathetic towards the ordinary delights and princely grandeur.

Renunciation 
He decided to renounced his worldly life, soon after his ascension to throne and after 3 months he obtained Kevala Jnana (omniscience) while mediating under Naga tree. After a many years of spreading his knowledge, he is said to have attained nirvana at Sammed Shikharji on the seventh day of the bright half of the month of faalgun.

Disciples 
According to Digambara Vaidarbha Svami and Varuṉā were the chief Ganadhara and Aryika of the Chandraprabha disciples and Dinna and Vāruṇī according to Śvētāmbara.

Legacy

Worship 
Jinastotrāņi is a collection of hymn dedicated to Chandraprabha along with Munisuvrata, Neminatha, Shantinatha, Mahavira, Parshvanatha and Rishabhanatha.

Svayambhūstotra by Acharya Samantabhadra is the adoration of twenty-four Tīrthankaras. Its five slokas (aphorisms) are dedicated to Tīrthankara Chandraprabha.

Chandraprabha is associated with crescent moon emblem, Naga tree, Vijya or Śyāma (Dig.) & Vijya (Svet.) Yaksha and Jwalamalini (Dig.) & Bhṛkuṭi (Svet.) Yakshi.

In literature 
Chandraprabha-charitra composed by Haribhadra is an adoration to Chandraprabha. Chandraprabha is mentioned in the Buddhist scriptures.

Iconography 
Chandraprabha is usually depicted in a lotus or kayotsarga posture, with a crescent moon symbol beneath him; each tīrthankara has a distinct emblem, which allows worshippers to distinguish similar idols. Like all tirthankaras, he is depicted with a Shrivatsa and downcast eyes.

The earliest known sculpture of Chandraprabha was installed by Maharajadhiraja Ramagupta of Gupta dynasty in 4th century CE. Chandraprabha has been popular amongst Jain everywhere in India. The iconography of Chandraprabha is particularly popular in Eastern India in Bihar, Bengal and Orissa. Sculptures of Chandraprabha were also popular in Jain temples, Deogarh, Khajuraho Jain temples  and Sonagiri.

Colossal statue 
Guru mandir in Mandaragiri houses a  monolithic statue of Chandraprabha.

Main temples 

Various Jain temple complexes across India feature him, and these are important pilgrimage sites in Jainism. Sonagiri, also known as  Laghu Sammed Shikhar is a Siddha-Kṣetra, is considered one of the most important Jain Tirtha (pilgrimage site). The mulnayak is a  rock cut image of Chandraprabhu dating back to the 5th to 6th century. There are a total of 103 temples with 77 on hill and 26 in village. 

Saavira Kambada Basadi (Thousand Pillared Temple ) in Moodabidri (Jain Kashi), built in 1430 CE, is considered an architectural wonder and is one of the most important Jain centers in Karnataka.

Important Chandraprabha temple complexes include: Tijara Jain temple, Jainimedu Jain temple, Chandravati, Kumbakonam Jain Temple, Mandaragiri, Prabhas Patan, Lunwa Jain temple, Chandranatha basadi Dharmasthala, and Chandraprabha temple, Pavagadh

See also

 Arihant (Jainism)
 God in Jainism
 Jainism and non-creationism

Notes

References

Citation

Sources

Books

Web

External links 
 Harvard Pluralism Project: Jainism

 
Tirthankaras
Solar dynasty